Allahabad Airport , officially known as Prayagraj Airport, is the primary domestic airport serving the city of Allahabad, Uttar Pradesh, India. It is located in the Bamrauli suburb of the city. One of the oldest airports in India,  the airport is jointly operated by the Indian Air Force and the Airports Authority of India.
It is one of the largest and busiest airports in Uttar Pradesh, ranking third in terms of handling passenger traffic after Lucknow and Varanasi. Foreseeing the Kumbh 2019, the airport was upgraded with addition of a new civil terminal extension in 2018, which was constructed in record 11 months by the TATA Projects group. The airport continues to serve domestic destinations across the country, and is set to be converted into International Airport before Mahakumbh 2025.

Bamrauli Air Force Station 
It is located in Bamrauli area of Allahabad and it is headquarters of Central Air Command.
It's one of the bases of Indian Armed Forces which operates under Central Air Command of Indian Air Force.

History
On 18 February 1911, the domestic commercial aviation took birth in India where Henri Piquet flew a Humber bi-plane carrying mail from a polo field at Allahabad to Naini, which is approximately six miles away. The construction of airport at Allahabad with dedicated airfield was started in 1924.

In 1931, the aerodrome at Allahabad was set up and the foundation for Air Traffic control services was laid with the appointment of an Indian Aerodrome Officer, specially trained at the airport in the UK. It was among the first four international airports of the country. It catered to international flights with direct services to London till 1932.

In July 1933, Imperial Airways commenced the operation of its flight on the Karachi-Jodhpur-Delhi-Kanpur-Allahabad-Kolkata route, which ran until June 1940. The airfield at Bamrauli was also used as one of the five compulsory stops of the MacRobertson Trophy Air Race which took place in October 1934.

From 1941 to the early 2000s, the airport did not cater to any regular commercial flight services. In early months of 2003, Air Sahara became the first carrier to re-introduce services at the airport with connectivity to cities like Delhi and Kolkata. However, the services soon became defunct following economic crisis. In 2005, Alliance Air (a regional connectivity subsidiary under Air India) started its Allahabad-Delhi flight service on the ATR-72 fleet, which continues to be operational to this date, with minor non-operational periods in between.

In 2013, SpiceJet introduced its operation in  the Delhi-Allahabad sector, along with Alliance Air commencing its Allahabad-Mumbai flight, both of which were closed down due to non-availability of ILS and Night Landing facility at the airport after running for a few months.

Seeking limited operational and structural facilities, construction of a new civilian terminal and installation of ILS system on existing runway began in January 2018. The newly constructed terminal was opened to public in January 2019 and since then is serving regular flight operations at Allahabad.

Structure

Runway

Landing amenities
The airport has ILS CAT-I compliant for landing during the night, bad weather and foggy conditions. The Instrument Landing System was installed during 2018–2019 expansion phase, along with construction of the new terminal. Other than enhancing safety for landing of flights in visibility as low as 550 meters, the installation of ILS finally allowed the airport to operate flights at night.

New terminal
Construction of the new terminal began in January 2018 and was completed in December 2018. It was inaugurated by Prime Minister Narendra Modi.

The terminal is 6700 square meter; has a peak hour capacity of 300 passengers and four aircraft parking bays for Airbus A320 and Boeing 737.

The building has an electric operated trolley gate on the link taxi track to segregate the operational area of Airports Authority of India and Indian Air Force. There has been use of fly ash bricks; double insulated door and the building is equipped with water harvesting and has a sewage treatment plant of its own.

Phase 2 extension
In February 2021, it was reported that there are plans for complete makeover of the civil enclave of Allahabad in Bamrauli in terms of size and the facilities. The AAI proposed an increase in the airport area twice its current size, with  the present building of the airport being expanded on both sides, keeping the terminal same. It will also include increasing the size of lounge, the number of aprons and the possibility to add two more aero-bridges.

Airlines and destinations

Statistics

See also
 List of airports in India
 List of the busiest airports in India
 Lal Bahadur Shastri Airport
 Gaya Airport

References

External links

Airports in Uttar Pradesh
Transport in Allahabad
Indian Air Force bases
Buildings and structures in Allahabad
World War II sites in India
Airports established in 1919
1919 establishments in India
20th-century architecture in India